Genie tegen geweld  is a 1916 Dutch silent film directed by Theo Frenkel.

Cast
 Adelqui Migliar - Pim Bruce
 Mary Beekman - Vrouw van de huisvriend / Wife of the family friend
 Aaf Bouber - (as Aaf Bouber-ten Hoope)
 Jan Cijsch - Huisvriend / Family friend
 Piet Fuchs - Dierentemmer / Animal tamer
 Henni Hillebrand - Jack
 Herman Hulsman - Diamanthandelaar / Diamonddealer
 Manus Hulsman
 Hendrik Kammemeijer - Agent / Policeman
 Jan Lemaire Sr. - Kantoorbediende / Clerk
 Hetty Ruijs - Vrouw van de diamanthandelaar / Wife of the diamonddealer
 Jacques Sequeira - Diamanthandelaar / Diamonddealer
 Jacques van Hoven - Kantoorbediende / Clerk

External links 
 

1916 films
Dutch black-and-white films
Films directed by Theo Frenkel
Dutch silent feature films